In advertising, an insert or blow-in card is a separate advertisement put in a magazine, newspaper, or other publication. They are usually the main source of income for non-subscription local newspapers and other publications. Sundays typically bring numerous large inserts in newspapers, because most weekly sales begin on that day, and it also has the highest circulation of any day of the week.

A buckslip or buck slip is a slip of paper, often the size of a U.S. dollar bill (a buck), which includes additional information about a product.

Bind-in cards are cards that are bound into the bindings of the publication, and will therefore not drop out.

See also

Onsert
Supplement (publishing)

References

External links
Free Ads Website
SEO & Google Ads
Tips For Online Business
Booklets In Strategic Marketing

Advertising publications by format
Magazine publishing